National Tertiary Route 925, or just Route 925 (or ) is a National Road Route of Costa Rica, located in the Guanacaste province.

Description
In Guanacaste province the route covers Cañas canton (Cañas, San Miguel districts), Tilarán canton (Tilarán, Líbano districts).

References

Highways in Costa Rica